Maryse Justin-Pyndiah (25 August 1959 – 25 September 1995) was a Mauritian long-distance runner. She died of cancer.

Family life
She was born as Maryse Justin and after marriage changed her name to Maryse Justin-Pyndiah. 

She worked in a textile factory in Floréal. As part of her training regime she ran daily from her home in Quatre Bornes to her workplace.

Achievements
At the 1985 Indian Ocean Island Games, Jeux des Îles de l'Océan Indien (JIOI) she came out first in the 3000m women's race event ahead of Albertine Rahéliarisoa and Jacqueline Razanadravao of Madagascar. 

Maryse Justin-Pyndiah also competed in the women's marathon at the 1988 Summer Olympics, where she ranked 51st.

Tribute
The Maryse Justin-Pyndiah Stadium, located in Réduit (Mauritius),  is named after her.

References

External links
 

1959 births
1995 deaths
Athletes (track and field) at the 1988 Summer Olympics
Mauritian female long-distance runners
Mauritian female marathon runners
Olympic athletes of Mauritius
Place of birth missing